The 2021 GP Industria & Artigianato di Larciano was the 52nd edition of the GP Industria & Artigianato di Larciano road cycling one-day race that was held on 7 March 2021. The 1.Pro-category race was initially scheduled to be a part of the inaugural edition of the UCI ProSeries, but after the 2020 edition was cancelled due to the COVID-19 pandemic, it made its UCI ProSeries debut in 2021, while also still being a part of the 2021 UCI Europe Tour.

Teams 
Nine UCI WorldTeams, nine UCI ProTeams, five UCI Continental teams, and one national team made up the twenty-five teams that participated in the race. Of the 169 riders in the race, there were 114 finishers.

UCI WorldTeams

 
 
 
 
 
 
 
 
 

UCI ProTeams

 
 
 
 
 
 
 
 
 

UCI Continental Teams

 
 
 
 
 

National Teams

 Italy

Result

References 

GP Industria and Artigianato di Larciano
GP Industria and Artigianato di Larciano
GP Industria and Artigianato di Larciano
2021
March 2021 sports events in Italy